Manduca brunalba is a moth of the  family Sphingidae. It is known from Brazil, French Guiana, Peru, Venezuela and Bolivia.

The wingspan is about 104 mm.

References

Manduca
Moths described in 1929